The 2012 Kumho Tyres V8 Touring Car Series is an Australian motor racing series for V8 Touring Cars, which are de-registered and superseded former V8 Supercars. Although the series utilised cars built for V8 Supercar racing, it is not an official V8 Supercar series.

It is the fifth running of the V8 Touring Car National Series. The series took place on the program of Shannons Nationals Motor Racing Championships events. It began at Eastern Creek Raceway on 9 March and finished at Sandown Raceway on 23 November after six meetings held in New South Wales, Victoria, Queensland and South Australia.

Calendar

Points System

In a change from the 2011 season, the points available for the third race at each event was increased by approximately 50%, while the top ten "Time Attack" single lap points session was abandoned.

Teams and drivers
The following teams and drivers competed in the 2012 Kumho Tyres V8 Touring Car Series.

See also
2012 V8 Supercar season

External links
Official series website

References

Kumho Tyres V8 Touring Car Series
V8 Touring Car Series